Dagda is a town in Dagda Parish, Krāslava Municipality in the Latgale region of Latvia, near the country's border with Belarus. It is the administrative center of Dagda Parish.

See also
 List of cities in Latvia

Towns in Latvia
Populated places established in 1992
Krāslava Municipality
Dvinsky Uyezd
Latgale